The Sainte-Marie Poutrelles Delta were a Canadian minor pro ice hockey team in Sainte-Marie, Quebec. They played in the Ligue centrale de hockey from 2003-2008, and the Ligue Nord-Americaine de Hockey from 2008-2009. The club folded in 2009.

Records
Games Jesse Belanger 31
Goals Jesse Belanger, Simon Nadeau 15
Assists Jesse Belanger 28
Points Jesse Belanger 43
PIM Neil Posillico 141

Notable players
Jesse Belanger
Maxime Ouellet
Michel Picard

External links
 The Internet Hockey Database

Ice hockey teams in Quebec
Ice hockey clubs established in 2003
Ice hockey clubs disestablished in 2009
Defunct Ligue Nord-Américaine de Hockey teams
Sainte-Marie, Quebec
2003 establishments in Quebec
2009 disestablishments in Quebec